Magnus Brännström (born June 4, 1966) is a Swedish businessman and advocate of the direct selling industry. Brännström has served as the CEO and president of the beauty company Oriflame since 2006 and became in 2017 the Chairman of the World Federation of Direct Selling Associations (WFDSA).

Brännström is one of few Swedish CEOs of his generation to have made his management career out of Russia. Before joining Oriflame's operations in Russia in 1996, Brännström worked for Swedish companies Spendrups, JGB and the former luxury hotell chain Reso entering the post-Soviet states of the early 90s. Brännström is a former Swedish navy reserve officer and combat diver.

References

Swedish businesspeople
People from Umeå
1966 births
Living people